This is a list of American citizens who have held titles of nobility from other countries. Nobility is not granted by the United States itself under the Title of Nobility Clause of the Constitution.

Princesses
 Alice Heine, Princess of Monaco
 Ariana Austin Makonnen
  Grace Kelly, Princess of Monaco
 Sarah Culberson
 Princess Anastasia of Greece and Denmark

Princes
  Josiah Harlan, Prince of Ghor

Duchesses
 Wallis Simpson, Duchess of Windsor
 Meghan, Duchess of Sussex
 Sacha Hamilton, Duchess of Abercorn
 Anna Gould
 Alice Heine
 Consuelo Vanderbilt, Duchess of Marlborough
 Helena Keith-Falconer, Countess of Kintore (formerly Duchess of Manchester)

Peers
American citizens who became peers by inheritance or creation.
 John Jacob Astor, 1st Baron Astor of Hever
 Waldorf Astor, 2nd Viscount Astor
  William Waldorf Astor, 1st Viscount Astor
 Albert Fairfax, 12th Lord Fairfax of Cameron
 Bryan Fairfax, 8th Lord Fairfax of Cameron
  10th Lord Fairfax of Cameron
 John Fairfax, 11th Lord Fairfax of Cameron
 Thomas Fairfax, 9th Lord Fairfax of Cameron
 Urban Huttleston Broughton, 1st Baron Fairhaven
  Christoper Guest, 5th Baron Haden-Guest
 John Copley, 1st Baron Lyndhurst
 Thomas Shaughnessy, 1st Baron Shaughnessy
 Joanna Shields, Baroness Shields
 Richard Alan Montagu-Stuart-Wortley, 5th Earl of Wharncliffe

Other nobility
 Ethel Beatty
 Elizabeth Beers-Curtis
 Lady Randolph Churchill
 Tennessee Claflin
 Elizabeth Wharton Drexel
 Flora Curzon, Lady Howe
 Mildred, Countess of Gosford
 Henry Hathaway, born marquis (Marquess) Henri Léopold de Fiennes
 Grace Curzon, Marchioness Curzon of Kedleston
 Mary Curzon, Baroness Curzon of Kedleston
 Helen Beresford, Baroness Decies
 Elise, Countess of Edla
 Adele Capell, Countess of Essex
 Thelma Furness, Viscountess Furness
 Paul Ilyinsky
 Clara Longworth de Chambrun
 Medora de Vallombrosa, Marquise de Morès
 Cissy Patterson
 Gladys Vanderbilt Széchenyi
 Alice Cornelia Thaw
 Benjamin Thompson
 Monica von Neumann
 Marianne Wellesley, Marchioness Wellesley
 Pauline Payne Whitney
 May Yohé

References

American
Nobility